Amaro is a Spanish and Portuguese surname. Notable people with the surname include:

André Amaro (born 2002), Portuguese footballer 
Joaquín Amaro (1889–1952), Mexican general
Mariane Amaro (born 1993), French footballer
Melanie Amaro (born 1992), American singer
Rubén Amaro Jr. (born 1965), American baseball player, general manager, and coach
Rubén Amaro Sr. (born 1936), Cuban–Mexican baseball player
J. C. Horner (born 1956), birth name of English Buddhist monk Ajahn Amaro

Spanish-language surnames
Portuguese-language surnames
Surnames of Spanish origin
Surnames of Portuguese origin